Ishkur's Guide to Electronic Music is an interactive online guide to electronic music created by Kenneth John Taylor, aka Ishkur. 
The website consists of 153 subgenres and 818 sound files. Genres include little-known ones like terrorcore and chemical breakbeat, and more popular genres like house or techno, diagrammed in a flowchart style.

History
The guide was originally posted in 1999 as a Flash website and continually updated until 2001. 

On December 11, 2016, Ishkur announced on Twitter that a new version of the guide would be released in 2017. Due to delays, Version 3.0 of the guide was instead released on August 20, 2019. Unlike the first two versions of the guide, the updated version no longer uses Adobe Flash.

Reception
CMJ New Music Monthly praised the website for its "...ease of navigation, pithy genre descriptions, and fairly accurate audio accompaniment..." Oliver Hurley of The Guardian referred to the site as an "epic online endeavour", but pointed that several of the genres were made up by Ishkur, such as "Buttrock Goa".

See also
Electronic music
Electronic dance music
List of electronic music genres
Genealogy of musical genres
Music genre
Music history

References

External links
Ishkur's Guide to Electronic Music, v3.0
Ishkur's Guide to Electronic Music, v2.5
Interview with Kenneth John Taylor

Internet properties established in 1999
Electronic music
Canadian music websites